The United States competed at the 15th Pan American Games in Rio de Janeiro, Brazil. The USA delegation was formed of 595 athletes, and was the second largest delegation in the competition, right after the Brazilian delegation. The USA delegation included 322 men and 273 women.

Medals

Gold

Women's individual competition: Jennifer Nichols
Men's team competition: Brady Ellison, Butch Johnson, Vic Wunderle

Men's 5,000 metres: Ed Moran
Men's 3,000 metres steeplechase: Joshua McAdams
Men's discus throw: Michael Robertson
Women's 100 metres: Mikele Barber
Women's 10,000 metres: Sara Slattery
Women's 400 metres hurdles: Sheena Johnson

Women's singles competition: Eva Lee
Women's doubles competition: Eva Lee, Mesinee Mangkalariki
Mixed doubles competition: Eva Lee, Howard Bach

Women's team competition: United States women's national basketball team

Men's light flyweight (48 kg): Luis Yanez
Men's light welterweight (64 kg): Karl Dargan

Men's 3 m springboard synchronized: Troy Dumais, Mitch Richeson
Men's 10 m platform synchronized: David Boudia, Thomas Finchum

Men's individual dressage: Christopher Hickey
Team dressage: US national team
Women's individual eventing: Karen O'Connor
Team eventing: US national team

Men's foil: Andras Horanyi
Women's épée: Courtney Hurley
Men's team sabre: Tim Hagamen, Benjamin Igoe, Benjamin (Benji) Ungar, James Williams

Men's 73 kg: Ryan Reser
Men's 81 kg: Travis Stevens
Women's 70 kg: Ronda Rousey

Men's individual competition: Eli Bremer

Men's 200 m freestyle: Matthew Owen
Men's 400 m freestyle: Matt Patton
Men's 1500 m freestyle: Chip Peterson
Men's 100 m backstroke: Randall Bal
Men's 4 × 100 m medley: Randall Bal, Mark Gangloff, Ricky Berens, Andy Grant
Men's 10 km open water: Fran Crippen
Women's 200 m freestyle: Ava Ohlgren
Women's 400 m freestyle: Jessica Rodriguez
Women's 800 m freestyle: Caroline Burckle
Women's 100 m backstroke: Julia Smit
Women's 200 m backstroke: Teresa Crippen
Women's 100 m breaststroke: Michelle McKeehan
Women's 200 m breaststroke: Caitlin Leverenz
Women's 100 m butterfly: Kathleen Hersey
Women's 200 m butterfly: Kathleen Hersey
Women's 200 m individual medley: Julia Smit
Women's 400 m individual medley: Kathleen Hersey
Women's 4 × 100 m freestyle: Julia Smit, Samantha Woodward, Emily Kukors, Maritza Correia
Women's 4 × 200 m freestyle: Jessica Rodriguez, Ava Ohlgren, Emily Kukors, Katie Carroll
Women's 4 × 100 m medley: Julia Smit, Michelle McKeehan, Kathleen Hersey, Maritza Correia
Women's 10 km open water: Chloe Sutton

Women's duet: Christina Jones, Andrea Nott
Women's team: US women's national team

Women's singles competition: Gao Jun
Women's team competition: US women's national team

Men's team competition: United States men's national water polo team
Women's team competition: United States women's national water polo team

Men's freestyle 55 kg: Henry Cejudo
Men's Greco-Roman 66 kg: Harry Lester
Men's Greco-Roman 84 kg: Brad Vering
Men's Greco-Roman 96 kg: Justin Ruiz
Women's freestyle 63 kg: Sara McMann
Women's freestyle 72 kg: Kristie Marano

Silver

Men's doubles competition: Howard Bach, Bob Malaythong

Men's team competition: United States national baseball team

Men's welterweight (69 kg): Demetrius Andrade

Women's 10 m platform: Haley Ishimatsu
Women's 3 m springboard synchronized: Ariel Rittenhouse, Kelci Bryant

Men's sabre: James Williams
Women's foil: Hanna Thompson
Women's sabre: Alexis Jemal
Women's team sabre: Emma Baratta, Eileen Grench, Alexis Jemal, Hanna Thompson

Women's team competition: United States women's national football team

Men's team competition: United States men's national volleyball team

Bronze

Men's individual competition: Vic Wunderle

Men's singles competition: Eric Go
Women's doubles competition: Kuei Ya Chen, Jamie Subandhi
Mixed doubles competition: Bob Maythong, Mesinee Mangkalakiri

Men's light heavyweight (81 kg): Christopher Downs

Men's 3 m springboard: Troy Dumais
Women's 3 m springboard: Kelci Bryant
Women's 10 m platform synchronized: Haley Ishimatsu, Mary Beth Dunnichay

Women's sabre: Emma Baratta
Men's team épée: Andras Horanyi, Weston Kelsey, Cody Mattern, Benjamin (Benji) Ungar

Women's team competition: United States women's national volleyball team

Results by event

Basketball

Men's team competition
Team roster
Joey Dorsey
Wayne Ellington
Shan Foster
James Gist
Roy Hibbert
Maarty Leunen
Derrick Low
Eric Maynor
Drew Neitzel
Scottie Reynolds
Kyle Weaver
D.J. White
Head coach: Jay Wright (Villanova University)

Women's team competition
Team roster
Mattee Ajavon
Nicky Anosike
Jayne Appel
Marissa Coleman
Emily Fox
Alexis Hornbuckle
Charde Houston
Natasha Humphrey
Erlana Larkins
Angel McCoughtry
Melanie Thomas
Candice Wiggins

Football

Women's team competition
Team roster
Alyssa Naeher
Brittany Taylor
Nikki Washington
Kaley Fountain
Teresa Noyola
Nikki Marshall
Casey Nogueira
Lauren Cheney
Jessica McDonald
Michelle Enyeart
Tobin Heath
Kylie Wright
Lauren Barnes
Gina Dimartino
Becky Edwards
Lauren Wilmoth
Kelley O'Hara
Chantel Jones
Head coach: Jill Ellis

Swimming

Triathlon

Men's competition
Andy Potts
 1:52:31.51 — Gold medal
Jarrod Shoemaker
 1:52:32.74 — 6th place
Brian Fleischmann
 1:53:37.36 — 8th place

Women's competition
Julie Ertel
 1:57:23.21 — Gold medal
Sarah Haskins
 1:57:46.23 — Silver medal
Sara McLarty
 2:02:07.68 — 10th place

Volleyball

Men's team competition
Team roster
David Lee
Sean Rooney
James Polster (c)
Brandon Taliaferro
Richard Lambourne
Andrew Hein
Brook Billings
Olree Pieter
Kevin Hansen
David McKienzie
Delano Thomas
Nils Nielsen
Head coach: Hugh McCutcheon

Women's team competition
Team roster
Danielle Scott (c)
Tayyiba Haneef
Charnette Fair
Kristen Michaelis
Foluke Akinradewo
Laura Tomes
Cynthia Barboza
Kimberly Hampton
Maurelle Hampton
Courtney Thompson
Lindsey Hunter
Cassie Busse
Head coach: Susan Woodstra

Weightlifting

Men's competition
Kendrick Farris
Chad Vaughn
Matt Bruce
Casey Burgener
Jeff Wittmer

Women's competition
Natalie Woolfolk
Melanie Roach
Emmy Vargas
Jackie Berube

See also
 United States at the 2008 Summer Olympics

References

External links
 USOC - Olympic committee.
 Athlete List
 Rio 2007

Nations at the 2007 Pan American Games
P
2007